Drei (Three) is the third studio album by German band Glashaus. Entirely written and produced by Moses Pelham and Martin Haas, it was released on 8 May 2005 via 3p Records. Drei debuted and peaked at number 4 on the German Albums Chart, becoming the trio's highest-charting album to date. It marked Cassandra Steen's final album with the band until her hiatus.

Track listing

Personnel
 Martin Haas - keyboard
 Ken Taylor - bass
 Raphael Zweifel - strings

Production
 Executive producers: Martin Haas, Moses Pelham
 Producer: Martin Haas, Moses Pelham
 Vocal assistance: Ali & Stauros, Julian Dettmering, Philipp Heilmann, Paul-Jakob Dettmering, Karl Haas, Benjamin Haas-Formell, Maximilian Haas-Formell, Charles Simmons
 Mixing: Martin Haas, Moses Pelham
 Mixing assistance: Birger Pucs
 Mastering: Chris Athens
 A&R: Moses Pelham
 Art Direction: Jens Klingelhöfer, Nachtwandler, Moses Pelham

Charts

Weekly charts

References

External links

2005 albums
Glashaus albums